Angelabella tecomae is a moth of the family Gracillariidae and the only species in the genus Angelabella. It is known from Chile.

The larvae feed on Tecoma fulva. They mine the leaves of their host plant. The final instar larva does not feed; it only has the spinneret and labial palpus developed, while other mouth parts are absent.

References

Gracillariidae
Endemic fauna of Chile